The Light Brigade is 2023 video game developed and published by American studio Funktronic Labs. The player controls a member of the titular Light Brigade as they fight to free their world from corrupted forces. The Light Brigade released in early access during February 2023 for PlayStation VR2, Meta Quest 2 and Microsoft Windows.

Gameplay 

The Light Brigade is a first-person roguelike in which the player inhabits a character with an eternal spirit, allowing them to return after each death. Using an arsenal of World War II weaponry, the player can take on enemy soldiers in order to make their way through each level. The player can pray in order to open doors and interact with objects. Movement in the game is controlled by teleporting, characterized in game as a dash. At the beginning of each run, the player can choose between six classes, each with different spells and weapons: scout, pistoleer, rifleman, assault, militia, and sniper. Spells can be cast, with different effects like creating a shield in front of the player or dealing poison damage to opponents. When the player's health dwindles to zero, they have two chances to take back their body before the run ends.

Reception 
NME enjoyed the class system, writing that it forced the player to "make tough choices about what to develop". Road to VR liked the gunplay, but felt that the lack of melee was a missed opportunity.

References 

2023 video games
First-person shooters
Funktronic Labs games
Meta Quest games
PlayStation VR2 games
Roguelike video games
Single-player video games
Virtual reality games
World War II video games